Aldo Luis González Barbery (born 5 September 1984) is a Bolivian athlete specialising in the shot put. He won a bronze medal at the 2014 South American Games and silver at the 2018 South American Games.

His personal best in the event is 19.11 metres set in Santa Cruz in 2016. This is the current national record.

International competitions

References

1984 births
Living people
Bolivian shot putters
Athletes (track and field) at the 2011 Pan American Games
Athletes (track and field) at the 2018 South American Games
South American Games silver medalists for Bolivia
South American Games bronze medalists for Bolivia
South American Games medalists in athletics
Pan American Games competitors for Bolivia